Suboccipital can refer to:
 Suboccipital nerve
 Suboccipital triangle
 Suboccipital muscles